Beautiful, Beautiful may refer to:

"Beautiful Beautiful", song My Paper Heart (album) Francesca Battistelli#Singles
"Beautiful Beautiful", song performed by Matt Monro	written Hal Shaper United Kingdom in the Eurovision Song Contest 1964